Nitish Kumar Reddy (born 26 May 2003) is an Indian cricketer. He made his first-class debut on 27 January 2020, for Andhra in the 2019–20 Ranji Trophy. He made his List A debut on 20 February 2021, for Andhra in the 2020–21 Vijay Hazare Trophy. He made his Twenty20 debut on 4 November 2021, for Andhra in the 2021–22 Syed Mushtaq Ali Trophy.

References

External links
 

2003 births
Living people
Indian cricketers
Andhra cricketers
Place of birth missing (living people)